Unknown Territory is the second studio album by Bomb the Bass, released on Rhythm King Records in 1991. It peaked at number 19 on the UK Albums Chart.

Production
Once again pioneering new sounds in the public arena, and following the success of "Winter in July", Unknown Territory would be the band's most well received release to date. Reviewing the album at the time, music writer and author Simon Reynolds attempted to outline a new genre in the making, suggesting that, by moving beyond mere dance tracks into fully cohesive albums, the band were venturing into "progressive dance".

Interviewed for Sound on Sound magazine in 1995, Simenon agreed with the interviewer when it was suggested that, with this more frenetic side of his work, he was looking to "combine the art of sampling with the energy of rock and roll."

Track listing

Charts

References

External links
 

1991 albums
Bomb the Bass albums
Albums produced by Tim Simenon